Nathan Altshiller Court (1881-1968) was a Polish-American mathematician, a geometer in particular and author of the famous book College Geometry - An Introduction to the Modern Geometry of the Triangle and the Circle.

Biography
Nathan Court was born on 22 January 1881, in Warsaw, Poland.   He attended the University of Uege and the University of Ghent in Belgium where he received his D.Sc in 1911. Soon after he came to the United States, he studied and taught at Columbia University. In 1912 he married Sophie Ravltch, whom he had known in Warsaw. Dr. Court taught at the University of Washington and the University of Colorado before coming to the University of Oklahoma in 1918. In 1919, he became a U.S. citizen and changed his last name to Court, keeping Altshiller as a middle name. He became a full Professor at the University of Oklahoma in 1935 and retired in 1951. He died in Norman 20 July 1968.

Major works

 College Geometry - An Introduction to the Modern Geometry of the Triangle and the Circle, Barnes & Noble, 1952)
 Modern Pure Solid Geometry, Macmillan, 1935
 Mathematics in Fun and in Earnest, New American Library, 1958

References

External links
 Biography
 Digital library Document

1881 births
1968 deaths
Geometers
20th-century American mathematicians
Congress Poland emigrants to the United States